Jan Semorád  (born March 19, 1988) is a Czech professional ice hockey player. He played with HC Pardubice in the Czech Extraliga during the 2010–11 Czech Extraliga season.

References

External links

1988 births
Czech ice hockey forwards
HC Dynamo Pardubice players
Living people
People from Česká Lípa
Sportspeople from the Liberec Region
Czech expatriate ice hockey players in Slovakia
Czech expatriate sportspeople in Iceland
Czech expatriate sportspeople in Poland
Expatriate ice hockey players in Iceland
Expatriate ice hockey players in Poland